Harrison Moore Miree (Born 1988) is an American drummer originally from Birmingham, Alabama, currently residing in Nashville, Tennessee. He has been the drummer for LoCash, Nashville's Clare Bowen, Ryan Follese of Hot Chelle Rae, Hardy, Levi Hummon, and others. Miree is known for his open-handed playing style, earning popularity in the drumming community through millions of views of his original videos on the streaming platform YouTube.

Career 

Miree was a founding member of the rock band Boom City, which used the internet as a platform for music and videos. Boom City signed with T.H.E. (an imprint of Atlantic Records Group), toured with pop-punk mentors Panic! at the Disco and Paramore, and eventually disbanded in 2012 over an unresolved dispute which ended in a settlement to redact all previous commercial recordings, resulting in the folding of the T.H.E. imprint. Miree graduated Berklee College of Music and moved to Nashville, securing the spot as touring drummer for recording artist Whitney Wolanin.

In 2014, Miree used his prior experience with internet video as a platform for creativity to begin posting weekly drumming videos to YouTube from his Nashville home. In the years that followed, his videos, which chronicled his rise through the ranks of professional drumming, amassed millions of views, earning him YouTube's Silver Creator Award in 2019 for surpassing 100,000 subscribers on the platform. His videos also demonstrated his expertise in the history and open-handed drumming techniques of Dave Matthews Band drummer Carter Beauford, popularizing his own remote hi-hat based approach to the style along the way, which eventually led to the two drummers meeting in a 2020 interview.

In 2015 he toured with then-Capitol Records artist Joey Hyde, and in 2016 toured with Big Machine artist Levi Hummon. In 2017, Miree toured with LoCash (known for hit songs I Love This Life and I Know Somebody), and Clare Bowen, singer/actress known for her role as Scarlett O'Connor on the television show Nashville. Miree has subsequently continued to perform with LoCash on headlining tours in support of their albums The Fighters and Brothers, as well as in a support act capacity for Rascal Flatts, Luke Bryan, and Chris Young.

Drumming techniques 

Miree's popularity among drummers stems from his unorthodox use of remote hi-hats (instead of traditional hi-hats) as his primary hats. Miree's drums are configured left-handed but right-footed, allowing him to approach the kit right-handed to create an open-handed effect, which in a February 2020 interview with Modern Drummer he dubbed "open-handed drumming for the lazy". Though Miree pioneered the so-called "lazy" style of open-handed drumming, he credits Dave Matthews Band drummer Carter Beauford for the original inspiration to play open-handed, and has paid tribute to Beauford throughout his YouTube videos, magazine interviews, and promotional appearances on shows such as Drumeo.

He has also spoken out against the traditional practice of teaching rudiments to developing students, stating that the needed elements to learn drumming exist organically in music, and that the use of robotic elements like rudiments early in development threaten what should otherwise be a joyful process of learning a musical instrument.

Equipment 

Miree uses Pearl Drums, Meinl cymbals, Evans drumheads, and Vic Firth drumsticks, with whom he developed and uses a signature drumstick model called "Harry Miree's DudeStick".

Personal life 

While Miree was in college, his only brother Kyser was murdered at home in Mobile, Alabama. During the public outrage that followed, Miree urged the press to "love and forgive" Kyser's killers.

Miree has also occasionally spoken publicly and to suicide grief support groups on his experiences with suicidal ideation.

References

External links
Official site
Official YouTube Channel

Living people
Berklee College of Music alumni
American rock drummers
American country drummers
1988 births